Lieutenant Giorgio (Italian: Il Tenente Giorgio) is a 1952 Italian historical melodrama film directed by Raffaello Matarazzo and starring Massimo Girotti, Milly Vitale and Paul Muller.  It was shot at the Ponti-De Laurentiis Studios in Rome and on location around San Giovanni in Fiore in Calabria. The film's sets were designed by the art director Piero Filippone.

Synopsis
In 1866 during the Risorgimento, an infantry lieutenant in Calabria fighting bandits is brought to a castle. There it is arranged for him to spend the night with a young woman, whose identity is concealed from him. Unknown to him, she is the daughter of an aristocratic family whose husband has failed to get her pregnant. Years, later, having left the army, the officer returns to the area still intrigued by the mysterious woman.

Cast
Massimo Girotti as Lt. G. Biserta
Milly Vitale as  	Countess  Elisa
Paul Muller as  	Count  Stefano di Monserrato
Gualtiero Tumiati as  	Stefano's Uncle
Teresa Franchini as  	Amalia
Eduardo Ciannelli as   	Barone di Polia
Achille Millo as   	Baroncino di Polia
Ludmilla Dudarova as  	Cousin of Elisa	
 Nino Pavese as Cafiero, il tutore
Luigi Pavese as   	Cafiero 
Enzo Fiermonte as   	Antonio Esposito
 Rita Livesi as Marianna
Michele Malaspina as   	Doctor
 Enzo Biliotti as Notaio Piovenda
 Ada Colangeli as 	Evelina 
 Carlo Delle Piane as Postiglione

References

Bibliography 
 Aprà, Adriano. The Fabulous Thirties: Italian cinema 1929-1944. Electa International, 1979.
 Chiti, Roberto & Poppi, Roberto. Dizionario del cinema italiano: Dal 1945 al 1959. Gremese Editore, 1991.

External links
 
 Il Tenente Giorgio at Variety Distribution

1952 films
1950s Italian-language films
Films directed by Raffaello Matarazzo
Italian black-and-white films
Italian historical drama films
1950s historical drama films
Melodrama films
1950s Italian films
Films set in Calabria
Films shot in Calabria
Films set in the 1860s